WSK may refer to:

 IATA code for Chongqing Wushan Airport, China
 Quanguo Waiyu Shuiping Kaoshi or WSK, a foreign language test administered in China
 Windows Vista networking technologies#Winsock Kernel
 Wytwórnia Sprzętu Komunikacyjnego (WSK), a name of Polish aerospace and automotive factories - see PZL 
 WSK (motorcycle), defunct Polish motorcycle manufacturer